Temporary Road is the fourth album by folk singer-songwriter John Gorka.  In 1992 there was some critical consensus that Gorka was one of the leading male voices of the "new folk" movement. As titles like "Looking Forward" and "Gravyland" might imply, the album has an overall optimistic tone.  High Street Records produced videos for the upbeat "When She Kisses Me" and "I Don't Feel Like a Train", both of which received some airplay on CMT.

Despite the upbeat tone of many tracks the album also contains some darker political commentary.  The title track, and "The Gypsy Life" offer reflections on the first Gulf War.  "Can You Understand My Joy?" is asked in an ironic, sarcastic way.  The mix of moods in Gorka's songs helped earn him the description of "the dark optimist."

Track listing
All songs written by John Gorka
 "Looking Forward" – 4:03
 "Baby Blues" – 3:40
 "The Gypsy Life"  – 4;23
 "Vinnie Charles Is Free" – 4:27
 "Gravyland" – 3:38
 "Temporary Road" – 3:30
 "All That Hammering" – 3:21
 "I Don't Feel Like A Train" – 3:06
 "When She Kisses Me" – 2:44
 "Grand Larceny" – 3:24
 "If I Could Forget To Breathe" – 2:28
 "Can You Understand My Joy" – 3:17
 "Brown Shirts" – 3:52

Personnel
 John Gorka – Vocals, 6 & 12-string guitars
 Nanci Griffith – Backing vocals
 Cliff Eberhardt – Backing vocals
 Lucy Kaplansky – Backing vocals
 Lee Satterfield – Backing vocals
 Dawn Atkinson – Backing vocals
 Denise Mininfield – Backing vocals
 Jennifer Newell – Backing vocals
 Charlene Moore – Backing vocals
 Tom Corwin – Backing vocals
 Darol Anger – Baritone violin
 Mike Marshall – Mandolin, nylon-string guitar
 William Gallison – Harmonica
 John Leventhal – Electric guitars
 Roy Rogers – Slide guitar, National steel guitar
 Sean Hopper – Synthesizer, organ
 Richard Tee – Organ
 Steve Gaboury – Synthesizer
 Michael Manring – Fretless bass
 Todd Phillips – Acoustic bass
 Rich Girard – Bass
 Denny Fongheiser – drums

Notes and sources

John Gorka albums
1992 albums
Albums produced by John Leventhal